Witzleben is a German municipality.

Witzleben may also refer to:
 Berlin Witzleben station, since 2002 named Berlin Messe Nord/ICC station

People with the surname
 Erwin von Witzleben (1881–1944), German officer and leading conspirator in the 20 July plot
 Job von Witzleben (1783–1837), Prussian lieutenant general, adjutant-general to the king, and minister of war
 Job von Witzleben (historian) (1916–1999), German army officer and a military historian